Fred Andrews (May 4, 1952 – December 20, 2021) was an American Major League Baseball second baseman who played for the Philadelphia Phillies in 1976 and 1977.

Biography
A native of Lafayette, Louisiana, Andrews attended high school in Lincoln Heights, Ohio and was selected by the Philadelphia Phillies in the 8th round of the 1970 MLB Draft. 

Andrews made his major league debut with Philadelphia in 1976, playing in four games for the club that season and 12 games in 1977. In two major league seasons, Andrews batted .276 (8-for-29) with 4 runs and 2 RBI in 16 games. Defensively, he handled 44 total chances (23 putouts, 21 assists) at second base without an error for a 1.000 fielding percentage.

Andrews was traded along with cash from the Phillies to the New York Mets for Bud Harrelson on March 23, 1978. He played the 1978 season with the Tidewater Tides of the AAA International League.

References

External links

Fred Andrews at SABR (Baseball BioProject)
Fred Andrews at Baseball Almanac
Fred Andrews at Pura Pelota (Venezuelan Professional Baseball League)

1952 births
2021 deaths
African-American baseball players
Águilas del Zulia players
American expatriate baseball players in Mexico
Baseball players from Louisiana
Lincoln High School (Gahanna, Ohio) alumni
Major League Baseball second basemen
Oklahoma City 89ers players
Petroleros de Poza Rica players
Philadelphia Phillies players
Pulaski Phillies players
Reading Phillies players
Santo Domingo Azucareros players
Spartanburg Phillies players
Sportspeople from Lafayette, Louisiana
Tidewater Tides players
Tigres de Aragua players
Toledo Mud Hens players
American expatriate baseball players in Venezuela